The SK-2 (Skorostnii Krylo – high speed wing), was a fighter aircraft designed and built in the USSR from 1940.

Development
After working as an engineer under Tairov at the OKO in Kiev, Bisnovat was permitted to  form his own OKB with the task of designing and building a high speed research aircraft, which emerged as the SK-1. The performance and handling of this aircraft prompted authorization for a fighter derivative

Construction of the SK-2 was of light-alloy stressed skin, with single plate web spar wings skinned with light-alloy sheet, smoothed to mirror finish accurate profiles using marquisette fabric, cork dust, open weave and adhesive as filler. Initially the wing was of NACA 23014.5 profile with slotted Vlasov style flaps, and fabric covered ailerons. The tail-unit also had fabric covered control surfaces, and trim tabs, with all controls 100% mass balanced.

The M-105 engine was fitted in a low drag installation with a pressurised coolant system which required a radiator of only 0.17m^2 frontal area (approx ½ that of a similar unpressurised coolant system), hydraulically retractable main and tail undercarriages with fully closing doors also reduced drag.

The SK-2 was a minimum change fighter derivative of the SK-1 with a normal protruding enclosed cockpit, normal light alloy wing skinning, enlarged fin and rudder, and two 12.7mm BS machine-guns in the top decking of the forward fuselage. Flown in October 1940 by G.M. Shiyanov, but no production was authorised.

Specifications (SK-2)

See also

References

 Gunston, Bill. “The Osprey Encyclopaedia of Russian Aircraft 1875–1995”. London, Osprey. 1995.

External links
 http://www.aviation.ru/Bisnovat/

1940s Soviet fighter aircraft
SK-2